Kerstin Haglund is a Swedish orienteering competitor. She is Relay World Champion from 1989, as a member of the Swedish winning team.

References

Year of birth missing (living people)
Living people
Swedish orienteers
Female orienteers
Foot orienteers
World Orienteering Championships medalists
20th-century Swedish women